Panonychus is a genus of spider mites in the family Tetranychidae. There are about 16 described species in Panonychus.

Species
These 16 species belong to the genus Panonychus:

 Panonychus akitanus Ehara, 1978 c g
 Panonychus bambusicola Ehara & Gotoh, 1991 c g
 Panonychus caglei Mellot, 1968 c g
 Panonychus caricae Hatzinikolis, 1984 c g
 Panonychus citri (McGregor, 1916) c g
 Panonychus elongatus Manson, 1963 c g
 Panonychus globosus Tseng, 1974 c g
 Panonychus hadzhibejliae (Reck, 1947) c g
 Panonychus inca Vis & Moraes, 2002 c g
 Panonychus lishanensis Tseng, 1990 c g
 Panonychus mori Yokoyama, 1929 c g
 Panonychus osmanthi Ehara & Gotoh, 1996 c g
 Panonychus pusillus (Ehara & Gotoh, 1987) c g
 Panonychus spinigerus (Lucas, 1849) c g
 Panonychus thelytokus Ehara & Gotoh, 1992 c g
 Panonychus ulmi (Koch, 1836) c g b (European red mite)

Data sources: i = ITIS, c = Catalogue of Life, g = GBIF, b = Bugguide.net

References

Further reading

External links

 

Trombidiformes